Paulo César de Oliveira (born 16 December 1973 in Cruzeiro) is a former Brazilian football referee.

Refereeing career
Paulo César de Oliveira took the refereeing course at the Federação Paulista de Futebol, he represents the State of São Paulo in the Brazilian football competitions.

Paulo César received his FIFA badge in 1999 and was ranked the number one referee by the Confederação Brasileira de Futebol in 2007.
He is also a CONMEBOL Elite Category referee.

In 2014, he retired of his refereeing career and became as a pundit for Brazilian TV channel Rede Globo.

Statistics

Série A

References

External links
 - Profile

1973 births
Living people
Brazilian football referees
People from Cruzeiro, São Paulo